Boisleux-au-Mont is a commune in the Pas-de-Calais department in the Hauts-de-France region in northern France.

Geography
A farming village located 6 miles (10 km) south of Arras at the junction of the D35 and D36 roads.

Population

Sights
 The church of St. Vaast, rebuilt after the destruction of the village during World War I.
 The Commonwealth War Graves Commission cemetery.

See also
Communes of the Pas-de-Calais department

References

External links

 The CWGC cemetery

Communes of Pas-de-Calais